Indigo Girls are an American folk rock music duo from Atlanta, Georgia, United States, consisting of Amy Ray and Emily Saliers. The two met in elementary school and began performing together as high school students in Decatur, Georgia, part of the Atlanta metropolitan area. They started performing with the name Indigo Girls as students at Emory University, performing weekly at The Dugout, a bar in Emory Village.

They released a self-produced, full-length record album entitled Strange Fire in 1987, and contracted with a major record company in 1988. After releasing nine albums with major record labels from 1987 through 2007, they have now resumed self-producing albums with their own IG Recordings company.

Outside of working on Indigo Girls–related projects, Ray has released solo albums and founded a non-profit organization that promotes independent musicians, while Saliers is an entrepreneur in the restaurant industry as well as a professional author; she also collaborates with her father, Don Saliers, in performing for special groups and causes. Saliers and Ray are both lesbians and are active in political and environmental causes.

Recording and touring

Early years 
Amy Ray and Emily Saliers first met and got to know each other as students at Laurel Ridge Elementary School in DeKalb County, Georgia, just outside Decatur, Georgia, but were not close friends because Saliers was a grade older than Ray. While attending Shamrock High School (now Druid Hills Middle School), they became better acquainted, and started performing together, first as "The B-Band" and then as "Saliers and Ray".

Saliers graduated and began attending Tulane University in Louisiana. A year later, Ray graduated high school and began attending Vanderbilt University in Tennessee. Homesick, both returned to Georgia and transferred to Emory University in Atlanta (where Saliers' father was a professor). 

By 1985, they had begun performing together again, this time as Indigo Girls. Saliers stated in a March 2007 National Public Radio Talk of the Nation interview, "we needed a name and we went through the dictionary looking for words that struck us and indigo was one."

Their first release in 1985 was a seven-inch single named "Crazy Game", with the B-side "Everybody's Waiting (for Someone to Come Home)".
That same year, the Indigo Girls released a six-track Extended play album named Indigo Girls, and in 1987 released their first full-length album, Strange Fire, recorded at John Keane Studio in Athens, Georgia, and including "Crazy Game". With this release, they secured the services of Russell Carter, who remains their manager to the present; they had first approached him when the EP album was released, but he told them their songs were "immature" and they were not likely to get a record deal. Strange Fire apparently changed his opinion.

Epic Records (1988–2006)
The success of 10,000 Maniacs, Tracy Chapman, and Suzanne Vega encouraged Epic Records to enlist other folk-based female singer-songwriters; Epic signed the duo in 1988. Their first major-label release, also named Indigo Girls, which scored No. 22 on the album chart, included a new version of "Land of Canaan", which was also on their 1985 EP album and on Strange Fire. Also on the self-titled release was their first hit "Closer to Fine" (a collaboration with Irish band Hothouse Flowers), which scored No. 52 on the popular music chart and No. 26 on the modern rock chart. They even managed one week on the mainstream rock album-oriented rock music chart at No. 48. In 1990, they won a Grammy Award for Best Contemporary Folk Album. They were also nominated for Best New Artist (but lost to Milli Vanilli who eventually had their award revoked).

Their second album, Nomads Indians Saints, went gold in December 1991 and included the hit song "Hammer and a Nail", a No. 12 modern rock music track; it was not as successful as their first, which was certified platinum at about the same time. The Indigo Girls followed it with the live Back on the Bus, Y'all and 1992's album Rites of Passage, featuring the song "Galileo", the duo's first top 10 modern rock music track (#10). During the accompanying tour in December, they invited on a few dates Siouxsie Sioux of Siouxsie and the Banshees as special guest to sing a couple of songs with them. They then recorded Swamp Ophelia in 1994, which went platinum in September 1996, and charted at No. 9 on the Billboard 200 album chart.

In 1995, the Indigo Girls released a live, double CD, 1200 Curfews. Shaming of the Sun was released in 1997 followed by Come on Now Social in 1999. Shaming of the Sun debuted at number seven on the Billboard charts, driven by the duo's contribution to the Lilith Fair music festival tour. The track "Shame on You" received more airplay on adult alternative, top 40 and adult top 40 radio stations than any of their previous singles, although this seemed to be a peak in their crossover success.

Retrospective, a compilation album with two new tracks, was released in 2000 and Become You followed two years later. Their last Epic studio album was All That We Let In, released in 2004 with an accompanying tour. On June 14, 2005, they released Rarities, a collection of B-sides and rare tracks partially decided by fans' input, which fulfilled the album count obligation for their contract with Epic.

Hollywood Records (2006–07) 

After departing Epic, the Indigo Girls signed a five-record deal with Hollywood Records. Their first (and only) Hollywood album, Despite Our Differences, produced by Mitchell Froom, was released on September 19, 2006. John Metzger from MusicBox Online described Despite our Differences as "the most infectious, pop-infused set that the duo ever has managed to concoct. In fact, its melodies, harmonies, and arrangements are so ingratiating that the album carries the weight of an instant classic." Thom Jurek from AllMusic wrote: "part of an emotional journey as complete as can be. More relevant than anyone dared expect. It's accessible and moving and true. It's their own brand of rock & roll, hewn from over the years, that bears a signature that is now indelible. A moving, and utterly poetic offering."

After releasing Despite Our Differences, the Indigo Girls' contract was terminated by Hollywood Records during their 2007 tour.

Independent work (2007–present) 

Following their break with Hollywood Records, the Indigo Girls announced their next record would be released independently.  Poseidon and the Bitter Bug was released on March 24, 2009, from IG Recordings, the Indigo Girls' label, and distributed through Vanguard Records. This album is their first fully independent release since 1987's Strange Fire, and their first two-CD set since 1995's live album 1200 Curfews; the first disc has the 10 tracks accompanied by a backing band, and the second includes the same 10 songs with only Ray and Saliers on vocals and acoustic guitars, and an additional track. On June 29, 2010 Indigo Girls' second full-length live album, Staring Down the Brilliant Dream, was released on IG Recordings/Vanguard Records. This was followed on October 12, 2010 with their first holiday album Holly Happy Days. Indigo Girls' thirteenth studio album, Beauty Queen Sister, was released on October 4, 2011, and their fourteenth studio album, One Lost Day, was released on June 2, 2015 (both on IG Recordings/Vanguard Records).

Beginning in 2017, the Indigo Girls have toured the United States performing their music arranged for symphony orchestra. After more than fifty performances, in 2018 they released a live double album entitled Indigo Girls Live with the University of Colorado Symphony Orchestra. In 2020, they followed this with the studio album Look Long.

Songwriting 

Ray and Saliers do not ordinarily collaborate in writing songs. They write separately and work out the arrangements together. There are a few exceptions, mostly unreleased songs from their early, pre-Epic days: "I Don't Know Your Name" and "If You Live Like That." "Blood Quantum", which appears on Honor: A Benefit for the Honor the Earth Campaign featured Ray's verses and chorus and Saliers's bridge. Finally, "I'll Give You My Skin", which appears both on Tame Yourself (a benefit album for People for the Ethical Treatment of Animals) and on the Indigo Girls release Rarities, is a collaborative work by Ray, Saliers, and Michael Stipe which is doubly rare, as Saliers and Ray usually write their songs without outside collaborators. In September 2020, the Indigo Girls released "Long Ride", the first song Ray and Saliers had written together in 30 years.

Touring band 
The Indigo Girls have toured as a duo and with a band. In 1990, they toured with Atlanta band the Ellen James Society backing them; they have also toured with side players, with one distinct group from 1991 to 1998, a second from 1999 to 2006, and a third from 2012 onwards.

First touring band
Budgie – drums (1992)
Gail Ann Dorsey – bass guitar (1994)
Sara Lee – bass guitar (1991–98)
Jerry Marotta – drums, percussion (1992–98)
Scarlet Rivera – violin (1992)
Jane Scarpantoni – cello (1992)

Second touring band
Brady Blade – drums (2002–04)
Matt Chamberlain – drums (2006–2009)
Blair Cunningham – drums (2000)
Caroline Dale – cello (1999)
Carol Isaacs – keyboards, accordion (1999–2007 and one show in Brighton)
Clare Kenny – bass guitar (1999–2007)
Caroline Lavelle – cello (2000)
Matt Brubeck - cello, percussion, vocals (2000)
John Reynolds – drums (1999)
Julie Wolf – keyboards, accordion (2008–present)

Third touring band
Jaron Pearlman – drums (2012–2016)
Benjamin Ryan Williams – bass (2012–2016)
Lyris Hung – violin (2012–present)

Solo projects 
In 1990, Ray founded Daemon Records, which has signed Magnapop, Ellen James Society, New Mongrels, Kristen Hall, Rose Polenzani, Girlyman, Athens Boys Choir, and James Hall among others.

Ray has put out six solo albums, entitled Stag, Prom, Live from Knoxville, Didn't It Feel Kinder, Amy Ray: Live MVP, Lung of Love, Goodnight Tender and Holler through Daemon. She has toured with both The Butchies and her bands The Volunteers and the Amy Ray Band.

Saliers also released a solo album, Murmuration Nation, in 2017, and was a founding co-owner of Watershed Restaurant in Decatur, Georgia. She sold Watershed in 2018. Saliers was an initial investor in the Flying Biscuit Cafe in Atlanta, Georgia. In 2005, Saliers and her father, Don Saliers, a theology professor at Candler School of Theology at Emory University, released the book A Song to Sing, a Life to Live: Reflections on Music as Spiritual Practice. They promoted the release of the book together including several days of speaking and performing together at the Washington National Cathedral College in Washington D.C.

Appearances in other media 
Ray and Saliers appeared in the latter half of the feature film Boys on the Side, playing short excerpts from their songs "Joking" and "Southland in the Springtime," as well as singing "Feliz Cumpleaños" ("Happy Birthday" in Spanish) with the gathered group of friends during the birthday cake scene, and standing on the far side of several shots over the next few scenes. Neither had any spoken lines. The duo also appear in the 2006 documentary Wordplay, where they discuss their reaction to appearing in a New York Times crossword puzzle and then begin to solve one together.

Ray and Saliers performed onstage in the 1994 revival of Jesus Christ Superstar in Atlanta, titled Jesus Christ Superstar: A Resurrection.  Ray played the role of Jesus and Saliers played the role of Mary Magdalene. They later reprised their roles in stagings of the musical in Austin, at the South by Southwest (SXSW) festival, and in Seattle.

They made several cameo appearances on the Ellen DeGeneres sitcom Ellen. In the episode "Womyn Fest" Ellen and her friends are attending a feminist music festival and catch the end of a performance by the Indigo Girls.

They are mentioned multiple times in the 1995 Stephen King novel Rose Madder as well as being mentioned in TV shows Buffy the Vampire Slayer, Will and Grace, South Park, 30 Rock, The Office, Squidbillies, The Big Bang Theory, Saturday Night Live, Tig Notaro's special Happy To Be Here, Harley Quinn and "Nip\Tuck".

Posters of the Indigo Girls could be seen on the bedroom walls of Beth Jordache, played by Anna Friel, in the British TV soap Brookside in 1994 and on Neve Campbell's character, Sidney Prescott‘s, bedroom wall in the 1996 slasher film Scream.

Appeared in 2018 onstage with standup comedian Tig Notaro's show "Happy to be Here" at The Heights in Houston, Texas, as a closing bit, performing one song.

Personal lives 
Both Ray and Saliers have long identified themselves as lesbians. Because of their engagements for LGBT rights, they are regarded as icons of the movement.

Amy Ray currently lives in the foothills of North Georgia. She and her longtime partner, Carrie Schrader, have a daughter, Ozilline Graydon.

Saliers married her longtime girlfriend, former Indigo Girls tour manager Tristin Chipman, at New York City Hall in 2013. Chipman, a Canadian, is from Calgary, "but she spent most of her adult life in Toronto," according to Saliers between songs when performing onstage in Vancouver in 2013. The couple already had a daughter, Cleo, born in November 2012.

Political activism 
The Indigo Girls have been politically active, championing the causes of and held benefit concerts for the environment, gay rights, the rights of Native Americans, and the National Coalition to Abolish the Death Penalty. For many years they incorporated a recycling and public outreach program into their road tours by including Greenpeace representative Stephanie Fairbanks in their road crew. They helped Winona LaDuke establish Honor the Earth, an organization dedicated to creating support and education for native environmental issues. After performing on the activist-oriented Spitfire Tour in 1999, Ray and Saliers joined forces with The Spitfire Agency to develop the Honor The Earth Tour, which visits colleges and Native communities, and raises money for their non-profit of the same name. Ray and Saliers have also appeared at the annual SOA Watch rallies, the March for Women's Lives, and several other rallies and protests.

In 2006 the Indigo Girls were featured in artist Pink's album I'm Not Dead in the song "Dear Mr. President", which Pink says is a political confrontation with George W. Bush about war, poverty, LGBT rights, abortion rights, and the No Child Left Behind Act. Returning the favor, Pink performed on the Indigo Girls' "Rock and Roll Heaven's Gate," which is about, among other things, sexism and heterosexism in the music industry.

In June 2007 the Indigo Girls were part of the multi-artist True Colors Tour 2007, on the tour's Las Vegas stop which benefited the Human Rights Campaign and other organizations that provide support to the LGBT community. The Indigo Girls performed again on the True Colors Tour 2008.

In April 2013, in response to criticism from transgender activists, the Indigo Girls issued a statement that they would play at the Michigan Womyn's Music Festival, but would protest the festival's "womyn-born womyn" policy from the stage, would donate any money received to trans activism, and would not return to the festival without "visible and concrete signs" that the policy would be changed.

In November 2017, the Indigo Girls were nominated to Out magazine's "OUT100" for 2017 in recognition of their work and their visibility.

The Indigo Girls are also members of the Canadian charity Artists Against Racism and have worked with them on awareness campaigns.

Discography

Studio albums

Live albums 

Perfect World was released as a promo CD maxi single on March 1, 2004 together with 3 live tracks.

Compilations

Singles

Other contributions 

 Deadicated (1991), covering "Uncle John's Band"
Put On Your Green Shoes (1993) – "Wild Wild Party In The Loquat Tree" 
Joan Baez – Ring Them Bells (1995) – "Don't Think Twice"
Sweet Relief II: Gravity of the Situation (1996) – "Free of Hope"
Burning London: The Clash Tribute (1999)  – "Clampdown"
107.1 KGSR Radio Austin – Broadcasts Vol. 10 (2002) – "Moment of Forgiveness"
WYEP Live and Direct: Volume 4 – On Air Performances (2002) – "Become You"
Pink – I'm Not Dead (2006) – "Dear Mr President"
Anne Murray – Anne Murray Duets: Friends & Legends (2007) – "A Little Good News"
Brandi Carlile – The Story (2007) – "Cannonball"
Metro: The Official Bootleg Series, Volume 1 (2010)
 Where Have All the Flowers Gone: A Tribute to Pete Seeger,  covering "Letter to Eve"
 Looking Into You: A Tribute to Jackson Browne (2014) covering "Fountain Of Sorrow"
 Joan Baez "75th Birthday Celebration" (2016) "The Water is Wide", "Don't Think Twice"

Live recording circulation 
Indigo Girls allow fans to tape their shows, and appropriately gathered recordings can be traded, obtained for free from a number of sources.

Awards and nominations
Americana Music Honors & Awards

!Ref
|-
| 2022
| Spirit of Americana/Free Speech Award
| Indigo Girls
| 
|

Women Songwriters Hall of Fame

Pell Awards

|-
| 2019
| Indigo Girls
| Pell Award for Lifetime Achievement in the Arts
| 

GLAAD Media Awards

|-
| 2003
| Become You
| Outstanding Music Album
| 

Grammy Awards

|-
| rowspan="2"|1990
| Themselves 
| Best New Artist
| 
|-
| Indigo Girls
| rowspan="2"|Best Contemporary Folk Recording
| 
|-
| 1991
| "Hammer and a Nail"
| 
|-
| 1992
| Back on the Bus, Y'all
| rowspan="4"|Best Contemporary Folk Album
| 
|-
| 1993
| Rites of Passage
| 
|-
| 1995
| Swamp Ophelia
| 
|-
| 1998
| Shaming of the Sun
| 

Pollstar Concert Industry Awards

!Ref.
|-
| 1990
| Tour
| Club Tour of the Year
| 
|

References

External links 

 
American folk musical groups
Epic Records artists
Feminist musicians
Grammy Award winners
Hollywood Records artists
Lesbian singers
American lesbian musicians
LGBT-themed musical groups
American LGBT singers
American LGBT songwriters
Musical groups from Atlanta
Vanguard Records artists
All-female bands
Lesbian songwriters
Musical groups established in 1985
LGBT culture in Atlanta
Rounder Records artists
1985 establishments in Georgia (U.S. state)
Female musical duos
American musical duos
Folk rock duos
20th-century American LGBT people
21st-century American LGBT people
American lesbian writers